Emuarius is an extinct genus of casuariiform flightless bird from Australia that lived during the early Miocene and late Oligocene. It is one of two known genera of emu. There are two known species in the genus, Emuarius gidju and Emuarius guljaruba. The birds in this genus are known as emuwaries. This name comes from a combination of emu and cassowary. This is due to its cassowary-like skull and femur and emu-like lower leg and foot.  Because of these similarities it is phylogenetically placed between cassowaries and emus.

References

 
 

Miocene birds
Oligocene birds of Australia
Extinct flightless birds
Riversleigh fauna
Miocene birds of Australia
Casuariidae
Fossil taxa described in 1992